Sam Brooks is a New Zealand playwright and dramatist. Brooks' works have appeared on stage in Auckland and throughout New Zealand, often produced through his company, Smoke Labours Productions. Brooks' work has twice earned him the Playmarket B4 25 New Zealand Young Playwright award. He has also been nominated for the Chapman Tripp award for Outstanding New Playwright and was highly commended for the Adam New Zealand New Play of the year award. In 2014, Metro Magazine named Brooks "Auckland's Most Exciting Playwright". He won the Bruce Mason Playwriting Award in 2016. He currently works as the culture editor at The Spinoff, an online commentary and opinion magazine. He has also written for the Pantograph Punch, Metro Magazine, and the NZ Herald.

Plays
A Pretty Good Year
Actressexual
And I Was Like
Another Dead Fag
Auckland Shakes
Burn Her
Goddess
I Lip Sync For Him
Jacinda (Commissioned for the 2018 Actors' Programme graduation show)
Kissback
Like Smoke In Here
Mab's Room
Queen
Riding In Cars With (Mostly Straight) Boys
Stutterpop
The 21st Narcissus(Commissioned for the 2015 Young and Hungry Festival of New Theatre)
The Construct
The Girl and the Gay
The Queen of the Ball
The Sacred Prodigies
The Winter Light
Twenty Eight Millimetres
Wine Lips
Wrists

References

External links
Playmarket, New Zealand Playwrights' Agency

21st-century New Zealand dramatists and playwrights
Year of birth missing (living people)
Living people
New Zealand male dramatists and playwrights